Berceni is a commune in Prahova County, Muntenia, Romania. It is composed of five villages: Berceni, Cartierul Dâmbu, Cătunu, Corlătești and Moara Nouă.

References

Berceni
Localities in Muntenia